"Everybody Wants to Be Like You" is a song by Canadian pop-reggae singer Snow from his 2000 album, Mind on the Moon. The song became Snow's highest-peaking single in Canada, surpassing his international hit "Informer" and reaching number two in October 2000.

Awards and honours
In 2001, the Society of Composers, Authors, and Music Publishers of Canada honored "Everybody Wants to Be Like You" for reaching the number one spot on MuchMusic and for topping MuchMoreMusic's video countdown.

Track listing
Canadian CD single
 "Everybody Wants to Be Like You" (radio edit) – 3:09
 "Everybody Wants to Be Like You" (album version) – 3:20
 "Everybody Wants to Be Like You" (reggae vocal) – 3:20

Charts

Weekly charts

Year-end charts

References

External links
 

1999 songs
2000 singles
Snow (musician) songs
Songs written by Snow (musician)
Virgin Records singles